Pass Me By may refer to:

 Pass Me By (album), by Peggy Lee, 1965
 "Pass Me By" (R5 song), 2013
 "Pass Me By (If You're Only Passing Through)", a song by Johnny Rodriguez, 1972; covered by Janie Fricke, 1980
 "Pass Me By", a song by Dinah Jane from Dinah Jane 1, 2019
 "Pass Me By", a song written by Cy Coleman and Carolyn Leigh for the film Father Goose, 1964

See also
 "Don't Pass Me By", a 1968 song by the Beatles